Zazalı (also, Zazaly) is a village and municipality in the Samukh Rayon of Azerbaijan.  It has a population of 579.

References 

Populated places in Samukh District